James McIvor is a former New Zealand boxer.

He was fourth in the men's welterweight (64 – 69 kg) division at the 1950 British Empire Games.

References

Welterweight boxers
Boxers at the 1950 British Empire Games
Commonwealth Games competitors for New Zealand
Living people
New Zealand male boxers
Year of birth missing (living people)